Yang Li-hua is a Taiwanese opera performer. During her career, she performed in nearly 170 productions on TTV. Unusual for Chinese opera, she played a wide variety of male roles.

Early life

Yang was born in Yuanshan, Yilan County, into a family with a theatrical background; her grandfather was the organiser of an amateur "peikuan" orchestra group, and her mother, Hsiao Chang-sou, was a famous male role-player with a Taiwanese opera group in Yilan County. During her childhood, Yang often accompanied her mother on tour, exposing her to Taiwanese opera from an early age. Yang began to play walk-on roles when she was four years old. At the age of seven, she played the lead in a play called An-An Chases Chickens 《安安趕雞》.

After starting school, Yang still visited her parents on tour regularly. Eventually, after visiting her parents during a school vacation, she refused to return to school, and despite opposition from her parents, she stayed to study Taiwanese opera under a strict regimen from her mother, practising proper ways of walking across the stage, conditioning by stretching muscles in her legs, basic martial arts movements, and singing.

She began performing in the 1950s, when Taiwanese opera was being performed in theaters rather than outdoors as it had been traditionally. Later, with the rising popularity of Taiwanese-language movies, many opera theaters were converted into movie theaters; the family fell on hard times and it was left to Yang as the eldest daughter to support her family.

Early career and broadcasting

Yang made her starring debut at age 16 in the opera Lu Wen-long 《陸文龍》. Her performances received public acclaim, and she was recruited by the Sai Chin Pao opera troupe, later being promoted alongside Hsiao Ming-ming, Hsiao Feng-hsien, and other popular stars as the troupe's "Seven Immortals". The group was invited by the Chinese expatriate community in the Philippines to perform in Manila, and they went on a six-month tour of the Philippines. Yang earned enough money to buy a house for her parents, the first they had ever owned, and developed a southeast Asian fan base.

During that period, Taiwanese opera was in decline, with the few remaining performance opportunties at outdoor religious ceremonies, weddings, and funerals. By 1962, the development of the domestic TV and movie industries had reduced the number of theatrical groups in Taiwan from around 200 down to 30. Yang's group disbanded in 1964, and she spent a year in her home village unemployed, before joining the Tien Ma Group in 1965, which became the watershed of Yang's career.

In an attempt to revive the genre, some radio shows again began highlighting Taiwanese opera, and performances by the Tien Ma Group were broadcast live throughout the island. Yang became a popular radio performer, with well-known hits such as Xue Dingshan 《薛丁山》. The lack of audience gave Yang experience of performing multiple characters at the same time, as radio stations attempted to economise. However, performing in falsetto was hard on Yang, who had previously always pushed her voice low to play male characters.

In 1966, when black-and-white television arrived in Taiwan, the only television station at the time, TTV, sought to add Taiwanese opera to its programming. Yang's troupe, Tienma, was selected for a weekly spot on the channel on the basis of its performance of Loyal Yue Fei 《岳飛》 with Yang in the lead role. Her performances during this period helped to popularise Taiwanese opera for new audiences, and Yang became a household name, known as the superstar of Taiwanese opera. During tours of Taiwan or abroad every few years, Yang was idolised by fans, who would often place gold pendants around her neck or thrown money onto the stage in red envelopes to express their admiration.

Opera producer and manager

In 1969, when Yang was 25, TTV's general manager appointed her the leader of the Taiwan Television Opera Troupe, and also the show's producer. Three years later, she integrated all the Taiwanese opera troupes in Taiwan to form the TTV United Taiwanese Opera Troupe.

In 1980, Yang laid down three objectives for the future: 1) to raise the standards of the production and performance of Taiwanese opera; 2) to reinforce basic research and development work in opera, specifically to record the original songs and compile new material; and 3) to support training for actors interested in performing Taiwanese opera.

To continue Taiwanese opera, Yang ant TTV organized a Taiwanese opera training class in 1981.

Yang felt that traditional Taiwanese Opera was held back by the stage – not only were the backdrops and props simplistic, there were also only two or three actors in each scene, which translated poorly to the TV format. She pushed for more lifelike productions, with more attention paid to props and costumes. As a producer she took steps to make the productions more dramatic and directed. In addition to having script outlines made, she also hired Ti Shan to write new pieces and Chen Tsung-ming to direct. She created stronger parts for actors playing male roles. She also had people search for lost Taiwanese Opera plays, write new melodies, and develop new singing styles.

Due to political restrictions at the time, Taiwanese Opera could only be on the air for 30 minutes. With commercials and credits, there were only about 23 minutes for the opera itself. A tight pace had to be maintained, so Yang cut out long, slow weeping scenes and emphasized faster-paced material. She added detailed dialogue and choreography. Though older audiences resisted these changes, the performances won larger audiences and brought Taiwanese Opera into the age of television.

The TTV Yang Li-hua Opera show came to an end in the 1990s, amid a deterioration in Yang's working relationship with the channel.

Notable works

Yang's hits over her decades-long career included: Seven Heroes and Five Gallants 《七俠五義》, The Legend of the Yang Clan 《楊家將》, Xue Rengui Conquers the East 《薛仁貴》, Liang Shanbo and Zhu Yingtai 《梁山伯與祝英台》 and A Civet for a Prince 《狸貓換太子》. The 1979 production A Hero's Shadow in the Autumn Frost 《俠影秋霜》 used cinematic special effects to heighten the excitement of sword fighting scenes. The following year, Xue Pinggui 《薛平貴》 was the first Taiwanese opera to be filmed outdoors, with actors riding horses across sands. The 1992 production The Patrolman and the Thief 《巡案與大盜》 was filmed on board a pirate ship in the ocean off Cebu, Philippines. 

Two years later, her God of the River Luo 《洛神》 was filmed on location in Beijing. She had Huang Shi, a renowned composer from the mainland, write music to be performed by a symphony orchestra. The production was the first Taiwanese opera program to be shown on Taiwanese prime time TV.

In addition to television productions, Yang also starred in many Taiwanese-language films. One of those, the 1981 film Chen San and Wu Niang 《陳三五娘》, was the last such Taiwanese-language production.

Yang starred in the 1982 Huangmei opera film Imperial Matchmaker directed by Pao Hsueh-li, alongside Ivy Ling Po.

In 1996, Yang was voted as one of the "ten hottest idols" by a gay and lesbian organization.

Live performances

In addition to making Taiwanese opera more elaborate and modernized, Yang also aimed to turn what was often thought of as a vulgar art form into high art. In 1981, Yang's group was invited to perform in Taipei's stately Sun Yat-sen Memorial Hall, and Yang chose her favourite drama, The Fisherwoman 《漁孃》 as the presentation, with assistance from students of the Haikuang Opera School.

The next year, the Taiwan Provincial Government invited Yang to tour across the island and stage traditional folk theater for fishermen, miners, and salt workers in villages around the island. "When you first arrive in a village, you can't even see a sign of human beings, but on the night of the performance, they emerge in throngs. I can't imagine where they come from. I love the live stage - much better than TV. You can breathe with the audience. Your special reward is the audience's immediate response, its joy and sorrow," she said.

In 1984, she toured the United States, Japan and the Philippines to entertain overseas Chinese under arrangements by the Government Information Office.

In 1991, her production of Lu Bu and Diao Chan 《呂布與貂嬋》 held at the National Theater caused a sensation.

In 1995, during a four-day engagement (October 25–28) at Taipei's National Theater, Yang reached back 30 years to restage a traditional opera that she had not appeared. The Taiwanese opera Lu Wen-long 《陸文龍》 in which Yang made her debut when she was 17 years old, owns a special place in her heart. The play, a story about a young warrior who grapples with feelings of love, hate, and clan loyalty during the Song Dynasty (960–1279), dazzled the Taipei audiences with demonstrations of martial arts. But it also had a tender side, that being the bittersweet romance between Lu and Yehlu. The versatile Yang excels in both areas; she can play it hard or soft. In the beginning of "Lu Wen-lung," Yang skillfully wields two spears in a rhythmic combat dance considered one of the most difficult martial art scenes in Taiwanese opera. To ensure a perfect scene, the actress said she practised with the spears three hours a day for an entire month. For the Taipei performances, however, Yang toned down the traditional emphasis on combat scenes to give the story a more intellectual appeal.

In 2000, Yang and her troupe performed Liang-Zhu 《梁祝》, a Chinese love story with a romantic yet tragic ending. The traditional story was adapted for the screen, radio and television. "This is one of the earliest and most traditional plays in the repertoire of Taiwanese opera," Yang said at a press conference in Taipei. Yang's six-day engagement attracted people from all walks of life. Tickets for the shows were purchased months in advance.

In one scene of Liang-Zhu 《梁祝》, Yang as the male lead carries the heroine on her back for several minutes. Yang said she is physically comfortable with this, as she has performed the scene many times during her long career. Yang's students Chen Ya-lan and Ji Li-ru played the other two important characters in the play. Both Chen and Ji have been in the Taiwanese opera circles for more than 20 years. Chen is also a popular actress, singer and hostess on television and has been known as Yang's successor.

In 2007, having been absent from the limelight for four years, Yang was asked to return to celebrate the twentieth anniversary of the opening of the National Theater by performing new versions of the operas A Civet for a Prince《狸貓換太子》 and A Life for the Master 《丹心救主》. She reworked the songs for the opera and newly choreographed the works in collaboration with  performer Hsiao Feng-hsien and Peking Opera director Chu Lu-hao, and also took on the challenge of playing three different parts. As well as playing the Song Dynasty emperor Renzong, who was traded for a raccoon as a child and who as an adult sought out his birth mother from among the commoners, she also played a loyal minister and the commoner who looked after the emperor's birth mother.

Personal life

Yang married Hung Wen-tung on 26 March 1983 at the Grand Hotel. The marriage drew thousands of uninvited fans to the Grand Hotel.

Legacy and recognition

Many scholars who studied drama said that Taiwanese opera would have died out several decades ago had it not been for Yang. In 1982, under arrangements made by the Taiwan Provincial Government, Yang led a touring troupe around Taiwan to encourage fishermen and miners. Many of her fans went to see and support her, thereby attaching more importance and significance to Taiwanese opera.

Yang's performances have won acclaim both at home and abroad.  
1967: National Theatre Contest Winner of Best Actor
1978: Columbia International Film Festival Award for the Most Popular Film
1985: Excellent TV Theatre Show --The Flirting Scholar 《風流才子唐伯虎》 
1988: The Golden Bell Award for Traditional Theatre~The Best Soap Opera -- Wang Wenying & Bamboo Reed Horse 《王文英與竹蘆馬》
1991: New York American Chinese Arts Association Award for Outstanding Asian Art Performer
1993: The Golden Bell Award for Special Contribution-for her lifetime contribution to the development of Taiwanese opera
1995: Taipei City Award for Folk Art Performer
1996: Overseas Chinese Affairs Commission's Huaguang Medal
1998: Elected One of Taiwan's 50 Most Influential People in the Past 400 Years by Common Wealth Magazine

References

External links 

 Lihua-city 戀戀花城
 Lihua-melody 楊麗花調曲未眠
 Lihua-sweethome 花落吾家
 Yang Lihua Opera-lyrics 戀花閣

1944 births
Living people
Taiwanese opera actresses
Taiwanese television actresses
Taiwanese film actresses
Taiwanese people of Hoklo descent
Taiwanese television producers
Male impersonators in Taiwanese opera
Women television producers
20th-century Taiwanese actresses
21st-century Taiwanese actresses
20th-century Taiwanese women singers
21st-century Taiwanese women singers